Dr Lucy Worsley  (born 18 December 1973) is a British historian, author, curator, and television presenter. She is joint chief curator at Historic Royal Palaces but is best known as a presenter of BBC Television series on historical topics.

Early life and education
Worsley was born in Reading, Berkshire, to Peter and Enid (née Kay) Worsley. Her father taught geology at Reading University, while her mother was a consultant in educational policy and practice. Before going to university, Worsley attended The Abbey School, Reading, St Bartholomew's School, Newbury, and West Bridgford School, Nottingham. She studied Ancient and Modern History at New College, Oxford, graduating in 1995 with a BA First-class honours degree. In 2001, she was awarded a DPhil degree from the University of Sussex.

Career

Curator and academic
Worsley began her career as a historic house curator at Milton Manor, near Abingdon, in the summer of 1995. before working for the Society for the Protection of Ancient Buildings. From 1996 to 2002, she was an inspector of historic buildings for English Heritage in the East Midlands region. During that time, she studied the life of William Cavendish, 1st Duke of Newcastle and wrote the English Heritage guide to his home, Bolsover Castle.  In 2001, she was awarded a DPhil degree from the University of Sussex for a thesis on The Architectural Patronage of William Cavendish, first Duke of Newcastle, 1593–1676. The thesis was later developed into Worsley's book Cavalier: A Tale of Chivalry, Passion and Great Houses published in 2007.

During 2002–2003, she was the major projects and research manager for Glasgow Museums before becoming chief curator at Historic Royal Palaces, the independent charity responsible for maintaining the Tower of London, Hampton Court Palace, Kensington Palace State Apartments, the Banqueting House in Whitehall and Kew Palace in Kew Gardens. She oversaw the £12 million refurbishment of the Kensington Palace state apartments and gardens completed in 2012.

In 2005, she was elected a senior research fellow at the Institute of Historical Research, University of London; she was also appointed visiting professor at Kingston University.

Television
In 2011, Worsley presented the four-part television series If Walls Could Talk, exploring the history of British homes, from peasants' cottages to palaces; and the three-part series Elegance and Decadence: The Age of the Regency. In 2012 she co-presented the three-part television series Antiques Uncovered, with antiques and collectibles expert Mark Hill, and (broadcast at the same time) Harlots, Housewives and Heroines, a three-part series on the lives of women after the Civil War and the Restoration of Charles II. Later that year she presented a documentary on Dorothy Hartley's Food in England as part of the BBC Four "Food and Drink" strand.

Her BBC series A Very British Murder (and the accompanying book, also released as The Art of the English Murder) examined the "morbid national obsession" with murder. The series looked at a number of cases from the 19th century, beginning with the Ratcliff Highway murders which gained national attention in 1811, the Red Barn Murder of 1826 and the "Bermondsey Horror" case of Frederick and Maria Manning in 1849.

In 2014, the three-part series The First Georgians: The German Kings Who Made Britain explored the contributions of the German-born kings George I and George II. The series explained why the Hanoverian George I came to be chosen as a British monarch, how he was succeeded by his very different son George II and why, without either, the current United Kingdom would likely be a very different place. The series emphasises the positive influence of these kings whilst showing the flaws in each. A Very British Romance, a three-part series for BBC Four, was based on the romantic novels and sought to uncover the forces shaping our very British idea of 'happily ever after' and how our feelings have been affected by social, political and cultural ideas.

In 2016, Worsley presented the three-part documentary Empire of the Tsars: Romanov Russia with Lucy Worsley in January and Lucy Worsley: Mozart's London Odyssey in June. In September 2016, she was filming an upcoming series A Very British History for BBC Four. In December she presented and appeared in dramatised accounts of the three-part BBC series Six Wives with Lucy Worsley. In 2017, she presented a three-part series entitled British History's Biggest Fibs with Lucy Worsley, debunking historical views of the Wars of the Roses, the Glorious Revolution and the British occupation of India.

In 2019, Worsley presented American History's Biggest Fibs, looking at the nation's founding story and American Revolution, the American Civil War, and the Cold War.

During February and March 2020 the first series of Royal History's Biggest Fibs with Lucy Worsley was shown on BBC Four; the three-part series discovers how the history of The Reformation, The Spanish Armada and Queen Anne and the Union have been manipulated and mythologised.

In November 2020, the second series of Royal History's Biggest Fibs with Lucy Worsley aired on BBC2, covering the myths behind The French Revolution, George IV and The Russian Revolution.

In 2022 Lucy Worsley Investigates began running.  The one hour programme investigates major events in British History, including The Black Death, The Madness of King George, and The Princes in the Tower.

Writing
Worsley has published a number of books, many guides to houses and the like. Courtiers: The Secret History of the Georgian Court (2011) is her most recent work on history.  In 2014, BBC Books published her book, A Very British Murder, which was based on the series.
In April 2016, Worsley published her debut children's novel, Eliza Rose, about a young noble girl in a Tudor Court. In 2017, Worsley published a biography of Jane Austen titled Jane Austen at Home: A Biography.

Worsley also wrote the young-adult book Lady Mary, a history-based book that details the life of Mary I, daughter of Henry VIII and Catherine of Aragon; it follows her as a young Princess Mary during the time of the divorce of Mary's parents.

Use of slur in a quote controversy

In August 2020, Worsley faced backlash for her use of the word "nigger" on a re-airing of her documentary, American History's Biggest Fibs. In the documentary, Worsley is seen quoting Abraham Lincoln's assassin, John Wilkes Booth, which included his use of the word. Following backlash on social media, Worsley tweeted "it wasn’t acceptable and I apologise". A BBC spokesperson for Worsley said that "presenter Lucy Worsley gave a clear warning to the audience before quoting John Wilkes Booth as the term clearly has the potential to cause offence."

Personal life
Worsley lives in Southwark by the River Thames in south London with her husband, architect Mark Hines, whom she married in November 2011. With reference to having children, Worsley once said she has been "educated out of normal reproductive function", but she later said her statement had been "misinterpreted and sounded darker than I'd intended."

As a television presenter, she is known for having a rhotacism, a minor speech impairment which affects her pronunciation of "r". When she made the move from BBC Four to BBC Two for the series Fit to Rule: How Royal Illness Changed History, she worked with a speech and language therapist to help with her pronunciation, but to no avail.

In her teens, Worsley represented Berkshire at cross country running and, as a pastime, is still a keen participant in the sport.

Awards and honours
 In February 2015, the Royal Television Society nominated Worsley (best presenter) and The First Georgians (best history programme) in its annual awards.
 In July 2015, she was made an honorary Doctor of Letters by the University of Sussex (where she completed her doctorate).
 She was appointed Officer of the Order of the British Empire (OBE) in the 2018 Birthday Honours for services to history and heritage.  The investiture by Charles, Prince of Wales, took place at Buckingham Palace on 16 November 2018.

Credits

Television programmes

Podcasts
 Lady Killers With Lucy Worsley (2022)
 Lady Killers With Lucy Worsley (2023)

Publications
 
 
 
 
 
 
 
 
 
 
 
 , fiction for children
 , fiction for children
 , young adult
 
 , young adult

References

External links

 BBC Historian Lucy Worsley explores her own past
 
Historic Royal Palaces Official Website
Lucy Worsley BBC Blog Page

'Lots of historians are sniffy about re-enactors' The Guardian 27 March 2011.

1973 births
Living people
Alumni of New College, Oxford
Alumni of the University of Sussex
English television presenters
Officers of the Order of the British Empire
People associated with Historic Royal Palaces
People educated at St. Bartholomew's School
People educated at West Bridgford School
People from Reading, Berkshire
People with speech impediment
English non-fiction writers
21st-century English historians
British women historians
British women curators